Rio School District is a school district in Ventura County, California. The district serves  students in the northeast portion of the city of Oxnard and the unincorporated communities of El Rio and Nyeland Acres. Rio feeds into the Oxnard Union High School District, specifically Rio Mesa and Pacifica high schools.

History
The Rio School District was founded in 1885 with the opening of a one-room schoolhouse on a ranch in what is now El Rio. The first class had at most 13 students.

In 2018, the district purchased a new headquarters building on Solar Drive in northeast Oxnard. The office space is shared with the Oxnard Union High School District, who relocated from their previous facilities on K Street in the flight path of Oxnard Airport.

Schools

Elementary schools
 Rio del Mar Elementary School
 Rio del Norte Elementary School
 Rio Lindo Elementary School
 Rio Plaza Elementary School
 Rio Rosales Elementary School

Middle schools
 Rio del Valle Middle School
 Rio Vista Middle School

K—8 schools
 Rio del Sol Elementary
 Rio Real Elementary

References

External links

 

Education in Oxnard, California
School districts in Ventura County, California
1885 establishments in California
School districts established in 1886